Cymothoe coccinata, the common red glider, is a butterfly in the family Nymphalidae. It is found in Ivory Coast, Ghana, Nigeria, Cameroon, the Republic of the Congo, Gabon and the Democratic Republic of the Congo. The habitat consists of forests.

The larvae feed on Rinorea oblongifolia.

Subspecies
Cymothoe coccinata coccinata (Ivory Coast, Ghana, Nigeria, Cameroon, Congo, Gabon, Democratic Republic of the Congo: Ubangi, Tshopo, Equateur)
Cymothoe coccinata vrydaghi Overlaet, 1944 (Democratic Republic of the Congo: Ubangi, Mongala, Uele, Kivu)

References

Butterflies described in 1874
Cymothoe (butterfly)
Butterflies of Africa
Taxa named by William Chapman Hewitson